Fragile is the debut studio album by American singer Cherrelle. It was released on April 8, 1984 by Tabu Records and was the first of four records for the label (she would leave Tabu after the release of 1991's "The Woman I Am").

The album was mostly written, arranged and produced by Jimmy Jam and Terry Lewis (a/k/a Flyte Time Productions), and, under their guidance, she scored a smash R&B hit with "I Didn't Mean to Turn You On". The song reached number eight on the US R&B chart and number 79 on the Billboard Hot 100.

Release history

Track listing

Personnel and production

Tracks 1-3, 5 & 7
Arranged & Produced By Jimmy Jam & Terry Lewis For Flyte Tyme Productions
Engineered & Mixed By Steve Wiese & Taavi Mote
Additional Recording Engineers: Judy Clapp & Steve Hodge
Jimmy Jam - synthesizers, synth programming, acoustic piano, drum programming, percussion, backing vocals
Terry Lewis - keyboards, synthesizers, electric bass, drum programming, backing vocals
Monte Moir - synthesizers, percussion, backing vocals
David Eiland - tuba, saxophone
Randy Jenkins, Lucia Newell, Gwendolyn Traylor - backing vocals

Tracks 4, 6 & 8
Arranged & Produced By Michael Everitt Dunlap & Isaac Suthers, with additional vocal arrangements by Maxi Anderson
Engineered By Robert Biles
Assistant Engineers: Michael Gilbert, Dennis Woods & Kelvin Dixon
Mixed By Mike Evans & Taavi Mote
Michael Everitt Dunlap - electric, acoustic and bass guitars, acoustic piano, drums, backing vocals
Isaac Suthers - synthesizers
Eric Sylvester Daniels - synthesizers, Fender Rhodes
Ellis Smith - electric and acoustic guitars
Terry Santiel - percussion
Maxi Anderson, Bill Champlin, Tamara Champlin, Phyllis St. James, Randall Jenkins, Gwenche Macho - backing vocals

References

1984 debut albums
Cherrelle albums
Albums produced by Jimmy Jam and Terry Lewis
Tabu Records albums
CBS Records albums